Staryye Tuymazy (İśke Tuymazı) is a rural locality (a selo) and the administrative centre of Starotuymazinsky Selsoviet, Tuymazinsky District, Bashkortostan, Russia. The population was 1,247 as of 2010. There are 29 streets.

Geography 
Staryye Tuymazy is located 10 km southwest of Tuymazy (the district's administrative centre) by road. Gorny is the nearest rural locality.

References 

Rural localities in Tuymazinsky District